Helen Fouché Gaines (October 12, 1888 – April 2, 1940) was a member of the American Cryptogram Association and editor of the book Cryptanalysis (originally Elementary Cryptanalysis) first published in 1939. The book described the principal cryptographic systems of the 19th century and cracking methods including elementary contact analysis (cryptanalysis). Her pen name was PICCOLA. Shortly after the publication of the book, she died.

Publications

References

External links 
ACA history of the book from The ACA and you
Official ACA site
Arkansas Women’s History Institute

Recreational cryptographers
1888 births
1940 deaths
People from Hot Springs, Arkansas
People from Lake Village, Arkansas